Kosovo (  or), officially the Republic of Kosovo, is a partially recognised state in Southeast Europe. It lies at the centre of the Balkans. Kosovo unilaterally declared its independence from Serbia on 17 February 2008, and has since gained diplomatic recognition as a sovereign state by 101 member states of the United Nations. It is bordered by Serbia to the north and east, North Macedonia to the southeast, Albania to the southwest, and Montenegro to the west. Most of central Kosovo is dominated by the vast plains and fields of Metohija and Kosovo field. The Accursed Mountains and Šar Mountains rise in the southwest and southeast, respectively. Its capital and largest city is Pristina.

In classical antiquity, the central tribe which emerged in the territory of Kosovo were the Dardani, who formed an independent polity known as the Kingdom of Dardania in the 4th century BC. It was annexed by the Roman Empire by the 1st century BC, and for the next millennium, the territory remained part of the Byzantine Empire, whose rule was eroded by Slavic invasions beginning in the 6th–7th century AD. In the centuries thereafter, control of the area alternated between the Byzantines and the First Bulgarian Empire. By the 13th century, Kosovo became the core of the Serbian medieval state, and has also been the seat of the Serbian Orthodox Church from the 14th century, when its status was upgraded to a patriarchate. Ottoman expansion in the Balkans in the late 14th and 15th century led to the decline and fall of the Serbian Empire; the Battle of Kosovo of 1389 is considered to be one of the defining moments in Serbian medieval history. The Ottomans fully conquered the region after the Second Battle of Kosovo. The Ottoman Empire ruled the area for almost five centuries until 1912.

In the late 19th century, Kosovo was the center of the Albanian National Movement and where the Albanian revolt of 1910 and Albanian revolt of 1912 took place. Following their defeat in the Balkan Wars, the Ottomans ceded Kosovo to Serbia and Montenegro. Both countries joined Yugoslavia after World War I, and following a period of Yugoslav unitarism in the Kingdom, the post-World War II Yugoslav constitution established the Autonomous Province of Kosovo and Metohija within the Yugoslav constituent republic of Serbia. Tensions between Kosovo's Albanian and Serb communities simmered through the 20th century and occasionally erupted into major violence, culminating in the Kosovo War of 1998 and 1999, which resulted in the withdrawal of the Yugoslav army, and the establishment of the United Nations Interim Administration Mission in Kosovo. Ultimately, Kosovo unilaterally declared its independence from Serbia on 17 February 2008, and has since gained diplomatic recognition as a sovereign state by 101 member states of the United Nations. Serbia does not officially recognise Kosovo as a sovereign state and continues to claim it as its constituent Autonomous Province of Kosovo and Metohija, although it accepts the governing authority of the Kosovo institutions as a part of the 2013 Brussels Agreement.

Kosovo is a developing country, with an upper-middle-income economy. It has experienced solid economic growth over the last decade as measured by international financial institutions since the onset of the financial crisis of 2007–2008. Kosovo is a member of the International Monetary Fund, World Bank, and has applied for membership in the Council of Europe, UNESCO, Interpol, and for observer status in the Organisation of Islamic Cooperation. In December 2022, Kosovo filed a formal application to become a member of the European Union.

Name 

In Serbia, a formal distinction is made between the eastern and western areas; the term  is used for the eastern part centred on the historical Kosovo Field, while the western part is called Metohija (known as Dukagjini in Albanian).

Kosovo is the Serbian neuter possessive adjective of kos (кос) "blackbird", an ellipsis for Kosovo Polje, 'blackbird field', the name of a plain situated in the eastern half of today's Kosovo and the site of the 1389 Battle of Kosovo Field. The name of the plain was applied to the Kosovo Province created in 1864.

Albanians also refer to Kosovo as Dardania, the name of an ancient kingdom and later Roman province, which covered the territory of modern-day Kosovo. The name is derived from the ancient tribe of the Dardani, possibly related to the Proto-Albanian term dardā, which means "pear". The former Kosovo President Ibrahim Rugova had been an enthusiastic backer of a "Dardanian" identity, and the Kosovar presidential flag and seal refer to this national identity. However, the name "Kosova" remains more widely used among the Albanian population.

The current borders of Kosovo were drawn while part of Yugoslavia in 1945, when the Autonomous Region of Kosovo and Metohija (1945–1963) was created as an administrative division of the new People's Republic of Serbia. In 1963, it was raised from the level of an autonomous region to the level of an autonomous province as the Autonomous Province of Kosovo and Metohija (1963–1968). In 1968, the dual name "Kosovo and Metohija" was reduced to a simple "Kosovo" in the name of the Socialist Autonomous Province of Kosovo. In 1990, the province was renamed the Autonomous Province of Kosovo and Metohija.

The official conventional long name of the state is Republic of Kosovo, as defined by the Constitution of Kosovo, and is used to represent Kosovo internationally. Additionally, as a result of an arrangement agreed between Pristina and Belgrade in talks mediated by the European Union, Kosovo has participated in some international forums and organisations under the title "Kosovo*" with a footnote stating, "This designation is without prejudice to positions on status, and is in line with UNSC 1244 and the ICJ Opinion on the Kosovo declaration of independence". This arrangement, which has been dubbed the "asterisk agreement", was agreed in an 11-point arrangement on 24 February 2012.

History

Early development 

The strategic position including the abundant natural resources were favorable for the development of human settlements in Kosovo, as is highlighted by the hundreds of archaeological sites identified throughout its territory. The first archaeological expedition in Kosovo was organised by the Austro-Hungarian army during the World War I in the Illyrian tumuli burial grounds of Nepërbishti within the district of Prizren. Since 2000, the increase in archaeological expeditions has revealed many, previously unknown sites. The earliest documented traces in Kosovo are associated to the Stone Age; namely, indications that cave dwellings might have existed, such as Radivojce Cave near the source of the Drin River, Grnčar Cave in the municipality of Viti and the Dema and Karamakaz Caves in the municipality of Peja.

Neolithic man is generally considered the beginning of human settlement in Kosovo. The earliest archaeological evidence of organised settlement, which have been found in Kosovo, belong to the Neolithic Starčevo and Vinča cultures. Vlashnjë and Runik are important sites of the Neolithic era – the rock art paintings at Mrrizi i Kobajës near Vlashnjë are the first find of prehistoric art in Kosovo. Amongst the finds of excavations in Neolithic Runik is a baked-clay ocarina, which is the first musical instrument recorded in Kosovo. The beginning of the Bronze Age coincides with the presence of tumuli burial grounds in western Kosovo, like the site of Romajë.

The Dardani were the most important Paleo-Balkan tribe in the region of Kosovo. A wide area which consists of Kosovo, parts of Northern Macedonia and eastern Serbia was named Dardania after them in classical antiquity, reaching to the Thraco-Illyrian contact zone in the east. In archaeological research, Illyrian names are predominant in western Dardania (present-day Kosovo), while Thracian names are mostly found in eastern Dardania (present-day south-eastern Serbia).

Thracian names are absent in western Dardania; some Illyrian names appear in the eastern parts. Thus, their identification as either an Illyrian or Thracian tribe has been a subject of debate, the ethnolinguistic relationship between the two groups being largely uncertain and debated itself as well. The correspondence of Illyrian names – including those of the ruling elite – in Dardania with those of the southern Illyrians suggests a "thracianization" of parts of Dardania. The Dardani retained an individuality and continued to maintain social independence after Roman conquest, playing an important role in the formation of new groupings in the Roman era.

The Roman state annexed Dardania by the first century AD. The importance of the area lay in its high mining potential (metalla Dardana), highlighted by the large mining complex of Municipium Dardanorum and the designation of part of the region as an imperial mining district. Kosovo was part of two provinces, Praevalitana and Dardania. Ulpiana is the most important municipium which developed in Kosovo. It was refounded as Justiniana Secunda under Justinian in the 6th century AD.

Middle Ages 

In the next centuries, Kosovo was a frontier province of the Byzantine Empire. The region was exposed to an increasing number of raids from the 4th century CE onward, culminating with the Slavic migrations of the 6th and 7th centuries.

Toponymic evidence suggests that Albanian was probably spoken in Kosovo prior to the Slavic settlement of the region.

There is one intriguing line of argument to suggest that the Slav presence in Kosovo and southernmost part of the Morava valley may have been quite weak in the first one or two centuries of Slav settlement. Only in the ninth century can the expansion of a strong Slav (or quasi-Slav) power into this region be observed. Under a series of ambitious rulers, the Bulgarians – a Slav population which absorbed, linguistically and culturally, its ruling elite of Turkic Bulgars – pushed westwards across modern Macedonia and eastern Serbia, until by the 850's they had taken over Kosovo and were pressing on the border of Serbian Principality.

The First Bulgarian Empire acquired Kosovo by the mid-9th century, but Byzantine control was restored by the late 10th century. In 1072, the leaders of the Bulgarian Uprising of Georgi Voiteh traveled from their center in Skopje to Prizren and held a meeting in which they invited Mihailo Vojislavljević of Duklja to send them assistance. Mihailo sent his son, Constantine Bodin with 300 of his soldiers. After they met, the Bulgarian magnates proclaimed him "Emperor of the Bulgarians". The uprising was defeated by Nikephoros Bryennios. Demetrios Chomatenos is the last Byzantine archbishop of Ohrid to include Prizren in his jurisdiction until 1219. Stefan Nemanja had seized the area along the White Drin in 1185-95 and the ecclesiastical split of Prizren from the Patriarchate in 1219 was the final act of establishing Nemanjić rule. Konstantin Jireček concluded, from the correspondence of archbishop Demetrios of Ohrid (1216–36), that Dardania (modern Kosovo) was increasingly populated by Albanians and the expansion started from Gjakova and Prizren area, prior to the Slavic expansion.

During the 13th and 14th centuries, Kosovo was a political, cultural and religious centre of the Serbian Kingdom. The zenith of Serbian power was reached in 1346 with the formation of the Serbian Empire (1346-1371). In the late 13th century, the seat of the Serbian Archbishopric was moved to Peja, and rulers centred themselves between Prizren and Skopje, during which time thousands of Christian monasteries and feudal-style forts and castles were erected, Stefan Dušan using Prizren Fortress as one of his temporary courts for a time. When the Serbian Empire fragmented into a conglomeration of principalities in 1371, Kosovo became the hereditary land of the House of Branković. During the late 14th and early 15th centuries, parts of Kosovo, the easternmost area located near Pristina, were part of the Principality of Dukagjini, which was later incorporated into an anti-Ottoman federation of all Albanian principalities, the League of Lezhë.

Medieval Monuments in Kosovo is a combined UNESCO World Heritage Site consisting of four Serbian Orthodox churches and monasteries. The constructions were founded by members of the Nemanjić dynasty, a prominent dynasty of Middle Age Serbia.

Ottoman rule 

In the 1389 Battle of Kosovo, Ottoman forces defeated a coalition led by Lazar of Serbia. Some historians, most notably Noel Malcolm, argue that the battle of Kosovo in 1389 did not end with an Ottoman victory and "Serbian statehood did survive for another seventy years." Soon after, Lazar's son accepted Turkish nominal vassalage (as did some other Serbian principalities) and Lazar's daughter was married to the Sultan to seal the peace. By 1459, Ottomans conquered the new Serbian capital of Smederevo, leaving Belgrade and Vojvodina under Hungarian rule until second quarter of the 16th century.

Kosovo was part of the Ottoman Empire from 1455 to 1912, at first as part of the eyalet of Rumelia, and from 1864 as a separate province (vilayet). During this time, Islam was introduced to the population. The Vilayet of Kosovo was an area much larger than today's Kosovo; it included all of current-day Kosovo, sections of the Sandžak region cutting into present-day Šumadija and Western Serbia and Montenegro, and the Kukës municipality, the surrounding region in present-day northern Albania and also parts of north-western North Macedonia, with the city of Skopje (then Üsküp), as its capital. Between 1881 and 1912, the Vilayet expanded to include other regions of present-day North Macedonia, including larger urban settlements such as Štip (İştip), Kumanovo (Kumanova) and Kratovo (Kratova). According to some historians, Serbs likely formed a majority of Kosovo from the 8th to the mid-19th century. However, this claim is difficult to prove, as historians who base their works on Ottoman sources of the time give solid evidence that at least the western and central parts of Kosovo had an Albanian majority — the scholar Fredrick F. Anscombe shows that Prizren and Vushtrri (Vulçitrin) had no Serbian population in the early 17th century. Prizren was inhabited by a mix of Catholic and Muslim Albanians, while Vushtrri had a mix of Albanian and Turkish speakers, followed by a tiny Serbian minority. Gjakova was founded by Albanians in the 16th century, and Peja (İpek) had a continuous presence of the Albanian Kelmendi tribe. Central Kosovo was mixed, but large parts of the Drenica Valley were ethnically Albanian. Central Kosovo, as well as the cities of Prizren, Gjakova, and the region of Has regularly supplied the Ottoman forces with levies and mercenaries.

The Ottoman defters of the 15th-16th centuries indicate that the Plains of Dukagjin in western Kosovo were inhabited by a majority of Albanian Christians of both the Orthodox and Catholic rites. The Slavic population was a small minority that was concentrated in the Nahiya of Peja and a small pocket in the Nahiya of Prizren; the documentation of Albanians in Peja at the end of the 15th century presupposes that Kosovo Albanians were early inhabitants of the region that pre-dated the Ottoman period. According to Paul Cohen, in the early sixteenth century, a large migration of Albanians into Kosovo resulted in a sizeable ethnic Albanian presence in some parts of Western Kosovo which continued into the next century. Historian Noel Malcolm challenges this view, using 15th-18th century Ottoman immigration documents and 17th century northern Albanian Catholic emigration sources to argue that the majority of the migrants into the Kosovo region during this period were not Albanian. The population of Kosovo was also much bigger than that of northern and central Albania and its rate of growth lower. Kosovo was part of the wider Ottoman region to be occupied by Austrian forces during the Great War of 1683–99, but the Ottomans re-established their rule of the region. Such acts of assistance by the Austrian Empire (then arch-rivals of the Ottoman Empire), or Russia, were always abortive or temporary at best. In 1690, the Serbian Patriarch Arsenije III led thousands of people from Kosovo to the Christian north, in what came to be known as the Great Serb Migration. Anscombe casts doubt on the fact that this exodus affected Kosovo, since there is no evidence that parts of Kosovo were depopulated. Evidence of depopulation can only be found in areas between Niš and Belgrade. Some Albanians from Skopje and other regions were displaced in order to fill some areas around Niš, but there is no evidence that such events took place in Kosovo. In 1766, the Ottomans abolished the Serbian Patriarchate of Peć and fully imposed the jizya on its non-Muslim population.

Although initially stout opponents of the advancing Turks, Albanian chiefs ultimately came to accept the Ottomans as sovereigns. The resulting alliance facilitated the mass conversion of Albanians to Islam. Given that the Ottoman Empire's subjects were divided along religious (rather than ethnic) lines, the spread of Islam greatly elevated the status of Albanian chiefs. Prior to this, they were organised along simple tribal lines, living in the mountainous areas of modern Albania (from Kruje to the Šar range). Soon, they expanded into a depopulated Kosovo, as well as northwestern Macedonia, although some might have been autochthonous to the region. However, Banac favours the idea that the main settlers of the time were Vlachs. Centuries earlier, Albanians of Kosovo were predominantly Christian and Albanians and Serbs for the most part co-existed peacefully. The Ottomans appeared to have a more deliberate approach to converting the Roman Catholic population who were mostly Albanians in comparison with the mostly Serbian adherents of Eastern Orthodoxy, as they viewed the former less favorably due to its allegiance to Rome, a competing regional power.

Many Albanians gained prominent positions in the Ottoman government, with "little cause of unrest", according to author Dennis Hupchik. "If anything, they grew important in Ottoman internal affairs." In the 19th century, there was an awakening of ethnic nationalism throughout the Balkans. The underlying ethnic tensions became part of a broader struggle of Christian Serbs against Muslim Albanians. The ethnic Albanian nationalism movement was centred in Kosovo. In 1878 the League of Prizren was formed, a political organisation that sought to unify all the Albanians of the Ottoman Empire in a common struggle for autonomy and greater cultural rights, although they generally desired the continuation of the Ottoman Empire. The League was dis-established in 1881 but enabled the awakening of a national identity among Albanians, whose ambitions competed with those of the Serbs, the Kingdom of Serbia wishing to incorporate this land that had formerly been within its empire.

The modern Albanian-Serbian conflict has its roots in the expulsion of the Albanians in 1877–1878 from areas that became incorporated into the Principality of Serbia. During and after the Serbian–Ottoman War of 1876–78, between 30,000 and 70,000 Muslims, mostly Albanians, were expelled by the Serb army from the Sanjak of Niš and fled to the Kosovo Vilayet. According to Austrian data, by the 1890s Kosovo was 70% Muslim (nearly entirely of Albanian descent) and less than 30% non-Muslim (primarily Serbs). In May 1901, Albanians pillaged and partially burned the cities of Novi Pazar, Sjenica and Pristina, and massacred Serbs in the area of Kolašin.

Kingdom of Yugoslavia 

The Young Turk movement took control of the Ottoman Empire after a coup in 1912 which deposed Sultan Abdul Hamid II. The movement supported a centralised form of government and opposed any sort of autonomy desired by the various nationalities of the Ottoman Empire. An allegiance to Ottomanism was promoted instead. An Albanian uprising in 1912 exposed the empire's northern territories in Kosovo and Novi Pazar, which led to an invasion by the Kingdom of Montenegro. The Ottomans suffered a serious defeat at the hands of Albanians in 1912, culminating in the Ottoman loss of most of its Albanian-inhabited lands. The Albanians threatened to march all the way to Salonika and reimpose Abdul Hamid.

A wave of Albanians in the Ottoman army ranks also deserted during this period, refusing to fight their own kin. In September 1912, a joint Balkan force made up of Serbian, Montenegrin, Bulgarian and Greek forces drove the Ottomans out of most of their European possessions. The rise of nationalism hampered relations between Albanians and Serbs in Kosovo, due to influence from Russians, Austrians and Ottomans. After the Ottomans' defeat in the First Balkan War, the 1913 Treaty of London was signed with Western Kosovo (Metohija) ceded to the Kingdom of Montenegro and Eastern Kosovo ceded to the Kingdom of Serbia. During the Balkan Wars, over 100,000 Albanians left Kosovo and around 20,000 were killed. Soon, there were concerted Serbian colonisation efforts in Kosovo during various periods between Serbia's 1912 takeover of the province and World War II, causing the population of Serbs in Kosovo to sharply decline after a period of growth.

Serbian authorities promoted creating new Serb settlements in Kosovo as well as the assimilation of Albanians into Serbian society, causing a mass exodus of Albanians from Kosovo. Numerous colonist Serb families moved into Kosovo, equalising the demographic balance between Albanians and Serbs. The figures of Albanians forcefully expelled from Kosovo range between 60,000 and 239,807, while Malcolm mentions 100,000–120,000. In combination with the politics of extermination and expulsion, there was also a process of assimilation through religious conversion of Albanian Muslims and Albanian Catholics into the Serbian Orthodox religion which took place as early as 1912. These politics seem to have been inspired by the nationalist ideologies of Ilija Garašanin and Jovan Cvijić.

In the winter of 1915–16, during World War I, Kosovo saw the retreat of the Serbian army as Kosovo was occupied by Bulgaria and Austria-Hungary. In 1918, the Allied Powers pushed the Central Powers out of Kosovo. After the end of World War I, the Kingdom of Serbia was transformed into the Kingdom of Serbs, Croats and Slovenians on 1 December 1918.

Kosovo was split into four counties, three belonging to Serbia (Zvečan, Kosovo and southern Metohija) and one to Montenegro (northern Metohija). However, the new administration system since 26 April 1922 split Kosovo among three districts (oblast) of the Kingdom: Kosovo, Raška and Zeta. In 1929, the country was transformed into the Kingdom of Yugoslavia and the territories of Kosovo were reorganised among the Banate of Zeta, the Banate of Morava and the Banate of Vardar. In order to change the ethnic composition of Kosovo, between 1912 and 1941 a large-scale Serbian re-colonisation of Kosovo was undertaken by the Belgrade government. Kosovar Albanians' right to receive education in their own language was denied alongside other non-Slavic or unrecognised Slavic nations of Yugoslavia, as the kingdom only recognised the Slavic Croat, Serb, and Slovene nations as constituent nations of Yugoslavia. Other Slavs had to identify as one of the three official Slavic nations and non-Slav nations deemed as minorities.

Albanians and other Muslims were forced to emigrate, mainly with the land reform which struck Albanian landowners in 1919, but also with direct violent measures. In 1935 and 1938, two agreements between the Kingdom of Yugoslavia and Turkey were signed on the expatriation of 240,000 Albanians to Turkey, but the expatriation did not occur due to the outbreak of World War II.

After the Axis invasion of Yugoslavia in 1941, most of Kosovo was assigned to Italian-controlled Albania, with the rest being controlled by Germany and Bulgaria. A three-dimensional conflict ensued, involving inter-ethnic, ideological, and international affiliations. Albanian collaborators persecuted Serb and Montenegrin settlers, with an estimated 10,000 killed and between 70,000 and 100,000 expelled or transferred to concentration camps in Pristina and Mitrovica. Nonetheless, these conflicts were relatively low-level compared with other areas of Yugoslavia during the war years, with two Serb historians also estimating that 12,000 Albanians died. An official investigation conducted by the Yugoslav government in 1964 recorded nearly 8,000 war-related fatalities in Kosovo between 1941 and 1945, 5,489 of whom were Serb or Montenegrin and 2,177 of whom were Albanian. There had been large-scale Albanian immigration from Albania to Kosovo, by some scholars estimated in the range from 72,000 to 260,000 people. Some historians and contemporary references emphasise that a large-scale migration of Albanians from Albania to Kosovo is not recorded in Axis documents.

Communist Yugoslavia 

The province as in its outline today first took shape in 1945 as the Autonomous Kosovo-Metohian Area. Until World War II, the only entity bearing the name of Kosovo had been a political unit carved from the former vilayet which bore no special significance to its internal population. In the Ottoman Empire (which previously controlled the territory), it had been a vilayet with its borders having been revised on several occasions. When the Ottoman province had last existed, it included areas which were by now either ceded to Albania, or found themselves within the newly created Yugoslav republics of Montenegro, or Macedonia (including its previous capital, Skopje) with another part in the Sandžak region of southwest Serbia.

Tensions between ethnic Albanians and the Yugoslav government were significant, not only due to ethnic tensions but also due to political ideological concerns, especially regarding relations with neighbouring Albania. Harsh repressive measures were imposed on Kosovo Albanians due to suspicions that there were sympathisers of the Stalinist regime of Enver Hoxha of Albania. In 1956, a show trial in Pristina was held in which multiple Albanian Communists of Kosovo were convicted of being infiltrators from Albania and were given long prison sentences. High-ranking Serbian communist official Aleksandar Ranković sought to secure the position of the Serbs in Kosovo and gave them dominance in Kosovo's nomenklatura.

Islam in Kosovo at this time was repressed and both Albanians and Muslim Slavs were encouraged to declare themselves to be Turkish and emigrate to Turkey. At the same time Serbs and Montenegrins dominated the government, security forces, and industrial employment in Kosovo. Albanians resented these conditions and protested against them in the late 1960s, accusing the actions taken by authorities in Kosovo as being colonialist, as well as demanding that Kosovo be made a republic, or declaring support for Albania.

After the ouster of Ranković in 1966, the agenda of pro-decentralisation reformers in Yugoslavia, especially from Slovenia and Croatia, succeeded in the late 1960s in attaining substantial decentralisation of powers, creating substantial autonomy in Kosovo and Vojvodina, and recognising a Muslim Yugoslav nationality. As a result of these reforms, there was a massive overhaul of Kosovo's nomenklatura and police, that shifted from being Serb-dominated to ethnic Albanian-dominated through firing Serbs in large scale. Further concessions were made to the ethnic Albanians of Kosovo in response to unrest, including the creation of the University of Pristina as an Albanian language institution. These changes created widespread fear among Serbs that they were being made second-class citizens in Yugoslavia. By the 1974 Constitution of Yugoslavia, Kosovo was granted major autonomy, allowing it to have its own administration, assembly, and judiciary; as well as having a membership in the collective presidency and the Yugoslav parliament, in which it held veto power.

In the aftermath of the 1974 constitution, concerns over the rise of Albanian nationalism in Kosovo rose with the widespread celebrations in 1978 of the 100th anniversary of the founding of the League of Prizren. Albanians felt that their status as a "minority" in Yugoslavia had made them second-class citizens in comparison with the "nations" of Yugoslavia and demanded that Kosovo be a constituent republic, alongside the other republics of Yugoslavia. Protests by Albanians in 1981 over the status of Kosovo resulted in Yugoslav territorial defence units being brought into Kosovo and a state of emergency being declared resulting in violence and the protests being crushed. In the aftermath of the 1981 protests, purges took place in the Communist Party, and rights that had been recently granted to Albanians were rescinded – including ending the provision of Albanian professors and Albanian language textbooks in the education system.

Due to very high birth rates, the proportion of Albanians increased from 75% to over 90%. In contrast, the number of Serbs barely increased, and in fact dropped from 15% to 8% of the total population, since many Serbs departed from Kosovo as a response to the tight economic climate and increased incidents with their Albanian neighbours. While there was tension, charges of "genocide" and planned harassment have been debunked as an excuse to revoke Kosovo's autonomy. For example, in 1986 the Serbian Orthodox Church published an official claim that Kosovo Serbs were being subjected to an Albanian program of 'genocide'.

Even though they were disproved by police statistics, they received wide attention in the Serbian press and that led to further ethnic problems and eventual removal of Kosovo's status. Beginning in March 1981, Kosovar Albanian students of the University of Pristina organised protests seeking that Kosovo become a republic within Yugoslavia and demanding their human rights. The protests were brutally suppressed by the police and army, with many protesters arrested. During the 1980s, ethnic tensions continued with frequent violent outbreaks against Yugoslav state authorities, resulting in a further increase in emigration of Kosovo Serbs and other ethnic groups. The Yugoslav leadership tried to suppress protests of Kosovo Serbs seeking protection from ethnic discrimination and violence.

Breakup of Yugoslavia and Kosovo War 

 
Inter-ethnic tensions continued to worsen in Kosovo throughout the 1980s. In 1989, Serbian President Slobodan Milošević, employing a mix of intimidation and political maneuvering, drastically reduced Kosovo's special autonomous status within Serbia and started cultural oppression of the ethnic Albanian population. Kosovar Albanians responded with a non-violent separatist movement, employing widespread civil disobedience and creation of parallel structures in education, medical care, and taxation, with the ultimate goal of achieving the independence of Kosovo.

In July 1990, the Kosovo Albanians proclaimed the existence of the Republic of Kosova, and declared it a sovereign and independent state in September 1992. In May 1992, Ibrahim Rugova was elected its president in an election in which only Kosovo Albanians participated. During its lifetime, the Republic of Kosova was only officially recognised by Albania. By the mid-1990s, the Kosovo Albanian population was growing restless, as the status of Kosovo was not resolved as part of the Dayton Agreement of November 1995, which ended the Bosnian War. By 1996, the Kosovo Liberation Army (KLA), an ethnic Albanian guerrilla paramilitary group that sought the separation of Kosovo and the eventual creation of a Greater Albania, had prevailed over the Rugova's non-violent resistance movement and launched attacks against the Yugoslav Army and Serbian police in Kosovo, resulting in the Kosovo War. The situation escalated further when Yugoslav and Serbian forces committed numerous massacres against Kosovo Albanians, such as the Prekaz massacre in which one of the KLA founders Adem Jasheri was surrounded in his home along with his extended family. In total 58 Kosovo Albanians were killed in this massacre, including 18 women and 10 children, in a massacre where mortars were fired on the houses and snipers shot those who fled. This massacre along with others motivated many Albanian men to join the KLA.

By 1998, international pressure compelled Yugoslavia to sign a ceasefire and partially withdraw its security forces. Events were to be monitored by Organization for Security and Co-operation in Europe (OSCE) observers according to an agreement negotiated by Richard Holbrooke. The ceasefire did not hold and fighting resumed in December 1998, culminating in the Račak massacre, which attracted further international attention to the conflict. Within weeks, a multilateral international conference was convened and by March had prepared a draft agreement known as the Rambouillet Accords, calling for the restoration of Kosovo's autonomy and the deployment of NATO peacekeeping forces. The Yugoslav delegation found the terms unacceptable and refused to sign the draft. Between 24 March and 10 June 1999, NATO intervened by bombing Yugoslavia, aiming to force Milošević to withdraw his forces from Kosovo, though NATO could not appeal to any particular motion of the Security Council of the United Nations to help legitimise its intervention. Combined with continued skirmishes between Albanian guerrillas and Yugoslav forces the conflict resulted in a further massive displacement of population in Kosovo.

During the conflict, roughly a million ethnic Albanians fled or were forcefully driven from Kosovo. In 1999 more than 11,000 deaths were reported to the office of the International Criminal Tribunal for the former Yugoslavia prosecutor Carla Del Ponte. , some 3,000 people were still missing, including 2,500 Albanians, 400 Serbs and 100 Roma. By June, Milošević agreed to a foreign military presence in Kosovo and the withdrawal of his troops. During the Kosovo War, over 90,000 Serbian and other non-Albanian refugees fled the province. In the days after the Yugoslav Army withdrew, over 80,000 Serb and other non-Albanian civilians (almost half of 200,000 estimated to live in Kosovo) were expelled from Kosovo, and many of the remaining civilians were victims of abuse. After the Kosovo and other Yugoslav Wars, Serbia became home to the highest number of refugees and IDPs (including Kosovo Serbs) in Europe.

In some villages under Albanian control in 1998, militants drove ethnic Serbs from their homes. Some of those who remained are unaccounted for and are presumed to have been abducted by the KLA and killed. The KLA detained an estimated 85 Serbs during its 19 July 1998 attack on Rahovec. 35 of these were subsequently released but the others remained. On 22 July 1998, the KLA briefly took control of the Belaćevac mine near the town of Obilić. Nine Serb mineworkers were captured that day and they remain on the International Committee of the Red Cross's list of the missing and are presumed to have been killed. In August 1998, 22 Serbian civilians were reportedly killed in the village of Klečka, where the police claimed to have discovered human remains and a kiln used to cremate the bodies. In September 1998, Serbian police collected 34 bodies of people believed to have been seized and murdered by the KLA, among them some ethnic Albanians, at Lake Radonjić near Glođane (Gllogjan) in what became known as the Lake Radonjić massacre. Human Rights Watch have raised questions about the validity of at least some of these allegations made by Serbian authorities.

The International Criminal Tribunal for the former Yugoslavia (ICTY) prosecuted crimes committed during the Kosovo War. Nine senior Yugoslav officials, including Milošević, were indicted for crimes against humanity and war crimes committed between January and June 1999. Six of the defendants were convicted, one was acquitted, one died before his trial could commence, and one (Milošević) died before his trial could conclude. Six KLA members were charged with crimes against humanity and war crimes by the ICTY following the war, and one was convicted.
In total around 10,317 civilians were killed during the war, of whom 8,676 were Albanians, 1,196 Serbs and 445 Roma and others in addition to 3,218 killed members of armed formations.

Post-war 

On 10 June 1999, the UN Security Council passed UN Security Council Resolution 1244, which placed Kosovo under transitional UN administration (UNMIK) and authorised Kosovo Force (KFOR), a NATO-led peacekeeping force. Resolution 1244 provided that Kosovo would have autonomy within the Federal Republic of Yugoslavia, and affirmed the territorial integrity of Yugoslavia, which has been legally succeeded by the Republic of Serbia.

Estimates of the number of Serbs who left when Serbian forces left Kosovo vary from 65,000 to 250,000. Within post-conflict Kosovo Albanian society, calls for retaliation for previous violence done by Serb forces during the war circulated through public culture. Widespread attacks against Serbian cultural sites commenced following the conflict and the return of hundreds of thousands of Kosovo Albanian refugees to their homes. In 2004, prolonged negotiations over Kosovo's future status, sociopolitical problems and nationalist sentiments resulted in the Kosovo unrest. 11 Albanians and 16 Serbs were killed, 900 people (including peacekeepers) were injured, and several houses, public buildings and churches were damaged or destroyed.

International negotiations began in 2006 to determine the final status of Kosovo, as envisaged under UN Security Council Resolution 1244. The UN-backed talks, led by UN Special Envoy Martti Ahtisaari, began in February 2006. Whilst progress was made on technical matters, both parties remained diametrically opposed on the question of status itself.

In February 2007, Ahtisaari delivered a draft status settlement proposal to leaders in Belgrade and Pristina, the basis for a draft UN Security Council Resolution which proposed 'supervised independence' for the province. A draft resolution, backed by the United States, the United Kingdom and other European members of the Security Council, was presented and rewritten four times to try to accommodate Russian concerns that such a resolution would undermine the principle of state sovereignty.

Russia, which holds a veto in the Security Council as one of five permanent members, had stated that it would not support any resolution which was not acceptable to both Belgrade and Kosovo Albanians. Whilst most observers had, at the beginning of the talks, anticipated independence as the most likely outcome, others have suggested that a rapid resolution might not be preferable.

After many weeks of discussions at the UN, the United States, United Kingdom and other European members of the Security Council formally 'discarded' a draft resolution backing Ahtisaari's proposal on 20 July 2007, having failed to secure Russian backing. Beginning in August, a "Troika" consisting of negotiators from the European Union (Wolfgang Ischinger), the United States (Frank G. Wisner) and Russia (Alexander Botsan-Kharchenko) launched a new effort to reach a status outcome acceptable to both Belgrade and Pristina. Despite Russian disapproval, the U.S., the United Kingdom, and France appeared likely to recognise Kosovar independence. A declaration of independence by Kosovar Albanian leaders was postponed until the end of the Serbian presidential elections (4 February 2008). A significant portion of politicians in both the EU and the US had feared that a premature declaration could boost support in Serbia for the nationalist candidate, Tomislav Nikolić.

Provisional self-government 

In November 2001, the Organization for Security and Co-operation in Europe supervised the first elections for the Assembly of Kosovo. After that election, Kosovo's political parties formed an all-party unity coalition and elected Ibrahim Rugova as president and Bajram Rexhepi (PDK) as Prime Minister. After Kosovo-wide elections in October 2004, the LDK and AAK formed a new governing coalition that did not include PDK and Ora. This coalition agreement resulted in Ramush Haradinaj (AAK) becoming Prime Minister, while Ibrahim Rugova retained the position of President. PDK and Ora were critical of the coalition agreement and have since frequently accused that government of corruption.

Parliamentary elections were held on 17 November 2007. After early results, Hashim Thaçi who was on course to gain 35 per cent of the vote, claimed victory for PDK, the Democratic Party of Kosovo, and stated his intention to declare independence. Thaçi formed a coalition with current president Fatmir Sejdiu's Democratic League which was in second place with 22 percent of the vote. The turnout at the election was particularly low. Most members of the Serb minority refused to vote.

After declaration of independence 

Kosovo declared independence from Serbia on 17 February 2008.  recognised its independence, including all of its immediate neighbours, with the exception of Serbia. However, 15 states have subsequently withdrawn recognition of the Republic of Kosovo. Russia and China do not recognise Kosovo's independence. Since declaring independence, it has become a member of international institutions such as the International Monetary Fund and World Bank, though not of the United Nations.

The Serb minority of Kosovo, which largely opposes the declaration of independence, has formed the Community Assembly of Kosovo and Metohija in response. The creation of the assembly was condemned by Kosovo's President Fatmir Sejdiu, while UNMIK has said the assembly is not a serious issue because it will not have an operative role.
On 8 October 2008, the UN General Assembly resolved, on a proposal by Serbia, to ask the International Court of Justice to render an advisory opinion on the legality of Kosovo's declaration of independence. The advisory opinion, which is not binding over decisions by states to recognise or not recognise Kosovo, was rendered on 22 July 2010, holding that Kosovo's declaration of independence was not in violation either of general principles of international law, which do not prohibit unilateral declarations of independence, nor of specific international law – in particular UNSCR 1244 – which did not define the final status process nor reserve the outcome to a decision of the Security Council.

Some rapprochement between the two governments took place on 19 April 2013 as both parties reached the Brussels Agreement, an agreement brokered by the EU that allowed the Serb minority in Kosovo to have its own police force and court of appeals. The agreement is yet to be ratified by either parliament. Presidents of Serbia and Kosovo organized two meetings, in Brussels on 27 February 2023 and Ohrid on 18 March 2023, to create and agree upon an 11-point agreement on implementing a European Union-backed deal to normalise ties between the two countries, which includes recognising "each other's documents such as passports and license plates"; president Vučić stated that it "will become part of the negotiation framework for both sides."

Governance 

Kosovo is a multi-party parliamentary representative democratic republic. It is governed by legislative, executive and judicial institutions, which derive from the constitution, although, until the Brussels Agreement, North Kosovo was in practice largely controlled by institutions of Serbia or parallel institutions funded by Serbia. Legislative functions are vested in both the Parliament and the ministers within their competencies. The Government exercises the executive power and is composed of the Prime Minister as the head of government, the Deputy Prime Ministers and the Ministers of the various ministries.

The judiciary is composed of the Supreme Court and subordinate courts, a Constitutional Court, and independent prosecutorial institutions. There also exist multiple independent institutions defined by the constitution and law, as well as local governments. It specifies that Kosovo is a "secular state" and neutral in matters of religious beliefs. Freedom of belief, conscience and religion is guaranteed with religious autonomy ensured and protected. All citizens are equal before the law and gender equality is ensured by the constitution. The Constitutional Framework guarantees a minimum of ten seats in the 120-member Assembly for Serbs, and ten for other minorities, and also guarantees Serbs and other minorities places in the Government.

The president serves as the head of state and represents the unity of the people, elected every five years, indirectly by the parliament through a secret ballot by a two-thirds majority of all deputies. The head of state invested primarily with representative responsibilities and powers. The president has the power to return draft legislation to the parliament for reconsideration and has a role in foreign affairs and certain official appointments. The Prime Minister serves as the head of government elected by the parliament. Ministers are nominated by the Prime Minister, and then confirmed by the parliament. The head of government exercises executive power of the territory.

Corruption is a major problem and an obstacle to the development of democracy in the country. Those in the judiciary appointed by the government to fight corruption are often government associates. Moreover, prominent politicians and party operatives who commit offences are not prosecuted due to the lack of laws and political will. Organised crime also poses a threat to the economy due to the practices of bribery, extortion and racketeering.

The government of Kosovo has exhibited severe shortcomings in the coordination of local and state police forces fighting international crime in the country. Since 2018, Kosovo Police was observed to raid warehouses and pharmacy establishments in Pristina and Mitrovica with no prior warning or coordination with city law enforcement. The smuggling of contraband goods, firearms as well as illicit drugs is a major obstacle for Kosovo's economic development and international recognition.

Foreign relations and military 

The foreign relations of Kosovo are conducted through the Ministry of Foreign Affairs in Pristina. , 101 out of 193 United Nations member states recognise the Republic of Kosovo. Within the European Union, it is recognised by 22 of 27 members and is a potential candidate for the future enlargement of the European Union. On 15 December 2022 Kosovo filed a formal application to become a member of the European Union.

Kosovo is a member of several international organisations including the International Monetary Fund, World Bank, International Road and Transport Union, Regional Cooperation Council, Council of Europe Development Bank, Venice Commission and European Bank for Reconstruction and Development. In 2015, Kosovo's bid to become a member of UNESCO fell three votes short of the two-thirds majority required to join. 21 countries maintain embassies in Kosovo. Kosovo maintains 24 diplomatic missions and 28 consular missions abroad.

The relations with Albania are in a special case considering that both countries share the same language and culture. The Albanian language is one of the official languages of Kosovo. Albania has an embassy in the capital Pristina and Kosovo an embassy in Tirana. In 1992, Albania was the only country whose parliament voted to recognise the Republic of Kosova. Albania was also one of the first countries to officially announce its recognition of the Republic of Kosovo in February 2008.

The Global Peace Index 2020 ranked Kosovo 85th out of 163 countries. Kosovo's biggest challenges were identified in the areas of ongoing conflicts and societal safety and security, which are affected by Kosovo's relations to its neighbors and its domestic societal and political stability.

Kosovo's military is the Kosovo Security Force. The President holds the title of commander-in-chief of the military. Citizens over the age of 18 are eligible to serve in the Kosovo Security Force. Members of the force are protected from discrimination on the basis of gender or ethnicity. The North Atlantic Treaty Organization (NATO) led the Kosovo Force (KFOR) and the Kosovo Protection Corps (KPC) in 2008, started preparations for the formation of the Kosovo Security Force. In 2014, the former Prime Minister Hashim Thaçi declared, that the National Government had decided to establish a Defence Ministry in 2019 and to officially transform the Kosovo Security Force into the Kosovo Armed Forces, an army which would meet all the standards of NATO members with the aim to join the alliance in the future. In December 2018, the parliament of Kosovo changed the mandate of the Kosovo Security Force by law and converted it to an army. It additionally established a Ministry of Defense.

Law 

The judicial system of Kosovo is a civil law system divided between courts with regular civil and criminal jurisdiction and administrative courts with jurisdiction over litigation between individuals and the public administration. As of the Constitution of Kosovo, the judicial system is composed of the Supreme Court, which is the highest judicial authority, a Constitutional Court, and an independent prosecutorial institution. All of them are administered by the Judicial Council located in Pristina. The Kosovo Police is the main state law enforcement agency in the nation. After the Independence of Kosovo in 2008, the force became the governmental agency. The agency carries nearly all general police duties such as criminal investigation, patrol activity, traffic policing, border control.

The Ahtisaari Plan envisaged two forms of international supervision of Kosovo after its independence such as the International Civilian Office (ICO), which would monitor the implementation of the Plan and would have a wide range of veto powers over legislative and executive actions, and the European Union Rule of Law Mission to Kosovo (EULEX), which would have the narrower mission of deploying police and civilian resources with the aim of developing the Kosovo Police and judicial systems but also with its own powers of arrest and prosecution.
The declaration of independence and subsequent Constitution granted these bodies the powers assigned to them by the Ahtisaari Plan. Since the Plan was not voted on by the UN Security Council, the ICO's legal status within Kosovo was dependent on the de facto situation and Kosovo legislation; it was supervised by an International Steering Group (ISG) composed of the main states which recognised Kosovo. It was never recognised by Serbia or other non-recognising states. EULEX was also initially opposed by Serbia, but its mandate and powers were accepted in late 2008 by Serbia and the UN Security Council as operating under the umbrella of the continuing UNMIK mandate, in a status-neutral way, but with its own operational independence. The ICO's existence terminated on 10 September 2012, after the ISG had determined that Kosovo had substantially fulfilled its obligations under the Ahtisaari Plan. EULEX continues its existence under both Kosovo and international law; in 2012 the Kosovo president formally requested a continuation of its mandate until 2014. Its mandate was further extended in 2016, 2018, 2020 and 2021. Since 2018, the mandate of EULEX has been greatly reduced and it now only has a monitoring role.

Minorities 

The relations between Kosovar Albanians and Kosovar Serbs have been hostile since the rise of nationalism in the Balkans during the 19th century. During Communism in Yugoslavia, the ethnic Albanians and Serbs were strongly irreconcilable, with sociological studies during the Tito-era indicating that ethnic Albanians and Serbs rarely accepted each other as neighbors or friends and few held inter-ethnic marriages. Ethnic prejudices, stereotypes and mutual distrust between ethnic Albanians and Serbs have remained common for decades. The level of intolerance and separation between both communities during the Tito-period was reported by sociologists to be worse than that of Croat and Serb communities in Yugoslavia, which also had tensions but held some closer relations between each other.

Despite their planned integration into the Kosovar society and their recognition in the Kosovar constitution, the Romani, Ashkali, and Egyptian communities continue to face many difficulties, such as segregation and discrimination, in housing, education, health, employment and social welfare. Many camps around Kosovo continue to house thousands of Internally Displaced People, all of whom are from minority groups and communities. Because many of the Roma are believed to have sided with the Serbs during the conflict, taking part in the widespread looting and destruction of Albanian property, Minority Rights Group International report that Romani people encounter hostility by Albanians outside their local areas.

Administrative divisions 

Kosovo is divided into seven districts, according to the Law of Kosovo and the Brussels Agreement of 2013, which stipulated the formation of new municipalities with Serb majority populations. The districts are further subdivided into 38 municipalities.

Geography 

It lies between latitudes 42° and 43° N, and longitudes 20° and 22° E. The northernmost point is Bellobërda at 43° 14' 06" northern latitude; the southernmost is Restelica at 41° 56' 40" northern latitude; the westernmost point is Bogë at 20° 3' 23" eastern longitude; and the easternmost point is Desivojca at 21° 44' 21" eastern longitude.

Most of the borders of Kosovo are dominated by mountainous and high terrain. The most noticeable topographical features are the Accursed Mountains and the Šar Mountains. The Accursed Mountains are a geological continuation of the Dinaric Alps. The mountains run laterally through the west along the border with Albania and Montenegro. The southeast is predominantly the Šar Mountains, which constitute the border with North Macedonia. Besides the mountain ranges, Kosovo's territory consists mostly of two major plains, the Kosovo Plain in the east and the Metohija Plain in the west.

Additionally, Kosovo consists of multiple geographic and ethnographic regions, such as Drenica, Dushkaja, Gollak, Has, Highlands of Gjakova, Llap, Llapusha and Rugova.

Kosovo's hydrological resources are relatively small; there are few lakes in Kosovo, the largest of which are Lake Gazivoda, Lake Radoniq, Lake Batlava and Lake Gračanica. In addition to these, Kosovo also does have karst springs, thermal and mineral water springs. The longest rivers of Kosovo include the White Drin, the South Morava and the Ibar. Sitnica, a tributary of Ibar, is the largest river lying completely within Kosovo's territory. River Nerodimka represents Europe's only instance of a river bifurcation flowing into the Black Sea and Aegean Sea.

Climate 

Most of Kosovo experiences predominantly a Continental climate with Mediterranean and Alpine influences, strongly influenced by Kosovo's proximity to the Adriatic Sea in the west, the Aegean Sea in the south as well as the European continental landmass in the north.

The coldest areas are situated in the mountainous region to the west and southeast, where an Alpine climate is prevalent. The warmest areas are mostly in the extreme southern areas close to the border with Albania, where a Mediterranean climate is the norm.

In the southwest, climatic area of Metohija receives more mediterranean influences with warmer summers, somewhat higher precipitation and heavy snowfalls in the winter. The mountainous areas of the Accursed Mountains in the west, Šar Mountains on the south and Kopaonik in the north experiences alpine climate, with high precipitation ( per year), short and fresh summers, and cold winters. Except Prizren and Istog, all other meteorological stations in January recorded average temperatures under .

Biodiversity 

Located in Southeastern Europe, Kosovo receives floral and faunal species from Europe and Eurasia. Forests are widespread in Kosovo and cover at least 39% of the region. Phytogeographically, it straddles the Illyrian province of the Circumboreal Region within the Boreal Kingdom. In addition, it falls within three terrestrial ecoregions: Balkan mixed forests, Dinaric Mountains mixed forests, and Pindus Mountains mixed forests. Kosovo's biodiversity is conserved in two national parks, eleven nature reserves and one hundred three other protected areas. The Bjeshkët e Nemuna National Park and Sharr Mountains National Park are the most important regions of vegetation and biodiversity in Kosovo. Kosovo had a 2019 Forest Landscape Integrity Index mean score of 5.19/10, ranking it 107th globally out of 172 countries.

Flora encompasses more than 1,800 species of vascular plant species, but the actual number is estimated to be higher than 2,500 species. The diversity is the result of the complex interaction of geology and hydrology creating a wide variety of habitat conditions for flora growth. Although, Kosovo represents only 2.3% of the entire surface area of the Balkans, in terms of vegetation it has 25% of the Balkan flora and about 18% of the European flora. The fauna is composed of a wide range of species. The mountainous west and southeast provide a great habitat for several rare or endangered species including brown bears, lynxes, wild cats, wolves, foxes, wild goats, roebucks and deers. A total of 255 species of birds have been recorded, with raptors such as the golden eagle, eastern imperial eagle and lesser kestrel living principally in the mountains of Kosovo.

Demographics 

The population of Kosovo, as defined by Agency of Statistics, was estimated in 2021 to be approximately 1,774,000. In 2011, the overall life expectancy at birth was 76.7 years; 74.1 years for males and 79.4 years for females. Kosovo ranks 11th most populous in the Balkans and 149th in the world.

In 2005, the Provisional Institutions of Self Government estimated the population of Kosovo to be between 1.9 and 2.2 million with the Albanians and Serbs being the largest ethnic groups followed by other groups such as Bosniak, Gorani, Turkish and Romani. However, according to the 2009 CIA World Factbook, Kosovo's population stands at 1,804,838 persons. It stated that ethnic composition was 88% Albanians, 7% Serbs and 5% of other ethnic groups including Bosniaks, Gorani, Romani, Turks, Ashkalis, Balkan Egyptians and Janjevci – Croats.

Albanians, steadily increasing in number, may have constituted a majority in Kosovo since the 19th century, although the region's historical ethnic composition is disputed. Kosovo's political boundaries do not fully coincide with the ethnic boundary by which Albanians compose an absolute majority in every municipality; for example, Serbs form a local majority in North Kosovo and two other municipalities, while there are large areas with an Albanian majority outside of Kosovo, namely in the neighbouring regions of former Yugoslavia: the north-west of North Macedonia, and in the Preševo Valley in Southern Serbia.

At 1.3% per year as of 2008 data, ethnic Albanians in Kosovo have the fastest rate of growth in population in Europe. In the second half of the 20th century, Kosovo Albanians had three times higher birth rates than Serbs. The UNHCR estimated in 2019 that the total number of IDPs (Serbs and non-Serbs) from Kosovo in Serbia are 68,514. In addition, most of Kosovo's pre-1999 Serb population relocated to Serbia proper following the ethnic cleansing campaign in 1999. Municipalities of Kosovo are largely rural, with only eight municipalities having more than 40,000 inhabitants living in the urban areas.

The official languages of Kosovo are Albanian and Serbian and the institutions are committed to ensure the equal use of those two languages. Turkish, Bosnian and Roma hold the status of official languages at municipal level if the linguistic community represents at least 5% of the total population of municipality.

Albanian is spoken as a first language by approximately 95% of the population, while Bosnian and Serbian are spoken by 1.7% and 1.6% of the population, respectively. Due to the boycott of the census of North Kosovo, Bosnian resulted in being the second-largest language after Albanian; however, Serbian is de facto the second-largest language in Kosovo.

Although both Albanian and Serbian are official languages, municipal civil servants are only required to speak one of them in a professional setting and, according to Language Commissioner of Kosovo, Slaviša Mladenović, statement from 2015, no organisations have all of their documents in both languages. The Law on the Use of Languages gives Turkish the status of an official language in the municipality of Prizren, irrespective of the size of the Turkish community living there.

A 2020 research report funded by the EU shows that there is a limited scale of trust and overall contact between the major ethnic groups in Kosovo.

Religion 

Kosovo is a secular state with no state religion; freedom of belief, conscience and religion is explicitly guaranteed in the Constitution of Kosovo. Kosovar society is strongly secularised and is ranked first in Southern Europe and ninth in the world as free and equal for tolerance towards religion and atheism.

In the 2011 census, 95.6% of the population of Kosovo was counted as Muslim and 3.7% as Christian including 2.2% as Roman Catholic and 1.5% as Eastern Orthodox. The remaining 0.3% of the population reported having no religion, or another religion, or did not provide an adequate answer. Protestants, although recognised as a religious group in Kosovo by the government, were not represented in the census. The census was largely boycotted by the Kosovo Serbs (who predominantly identify as Serbian Orthodox Christians), especially in North Kosovo, leaving the Serb population underrepresented.

Islam is the most widely practiced religion in Kosovo and was introduced in the Middle Ages by the Ottomans. Today, Kosovo has the highest percentage of Muslims in Europe after Turkey. The majority of the Muslim population of Kosovo are ethnic Albanians, Turks, and Slavs such as Gorani and Bosniaks.

Christianity has a long and continuous history in Kosovo which can be traced back to the Roman invasion of the region. During the Middle Ages, the entire Balkan Peninsula had been Christianised initially by the Romans and subsequently by the Byzantine Empire. Followers of the Roman Catholic Church are predominantly Albanians while ethnic Serbs follow the Eastern Orthodox Church. In 2008, Protestant pastor Artur Krasniqi, primate of the Kosovo Protestant Evangelical Church, claimed that "as many as 15,000" Kosovar Albanians had converted to Protestantism since 1985.

Relations between the Albanian Muslim and Albanian Catholic communities in Kosovo are good; however, both communities have few or no relations with the Serbian Orthodox community. In general, the Albanians define their ethnicity by language and not by religion, while religion reflects a distinguishing identity feature among the Slavs of Kosovo and elsewhere.

Economy 

The economy of Kosovo is a transitional economy. It suffered from the combined results of political upheaval, the Serbian dismissal of Kosovo employees and the following Yugoslav Wars. Despite declining foreign assistance, the GDP has mostly grown since its declaration of independence. This was despite the financial crisis of 2007–2008 and the subsequent European debt crisis. Additionally, the inflation rate has been low. Most economic development has taken place in the trade, retail and construction sectors. Kosovo is highly dependent on remittances from the diaspora, FDI and other capital inflows. Kosovo is one of the poorest countries in Europe. In 2018, the International Monetary Fund reported that approximately one-sixth of the population lived below the poverty line and one-third of the working age population was unemployed, the highest rate in Europe.

Kosovo's largest trading partners are Albania, Italy, Switzerland, China, Germany and Turkey. The Euro is its official currency. The Government of Kosovo has signed free-trade agreements with Croatia, Bosnia and Herzegovina, Albania and North Macedonia. Kosovo is a member of CEFTA, agreed with UNMIK, and enjoys free trade with most nearby non-European Union countries.

The secondary sector accounted for 22.60% of GDP and a general workforce of 800,000 employees in 2009. There are several reasons for this stagnation, ranging from consecutive occupations, political turmoil and the War in Kosovo in 1999. 
 
The electricity sector is considered one of the sectors with the greatest potential of development. Kosovo's electricity sector is highly dependent on coal-fired power plants, which use the abundant lignite, so efforts are being made to diversify electricity production, such as wind farms in Bajgora and Kitka.

In April 2020 Kosovo with KOSTT, the government-owned Transmission System Operator, declared its independence from the Serbian electricity transmission operator Elektromreža Srbije with a vote by the European Network of Transmission System Operators for Electricity, ENTSO-E, which has paved the way for Kosovo to become an independent regulatory zone for electricity. The vote confirms that a connection agreement will be signed between ENTSO-E and KOSTT, allowing KOSTT to join the 42 other transmission operators. A joint energy bloc between Kosovo and Albania, is in work after an agreement which was signed in December 2019. With that agreement Albania and Kosovo will now be able to exchange energy reserves, which is expected to result in €4 million in savings per year for Kosovo.

Kosovo has large reserves of lead, zinc, silver, nickel, cobalt, copper, iron and bauxite. The nation has the fifth-largest lignite reserves in the world and the 3rd in Europe. The Directorate for Mines and Minerals and the World Bank estimated that Kosovo had €13.5 billion worth of minerals in 2005.

The primary sector is based on small to medium-sized family-owned dispersed units. 53% of the nation's area is agricultural land, 41% forest and forestry land, and 6% for others. The arable land is mostly used for corn, wheat, pastures, meadows and vineyards. It contributes almost to 35% of GDP including the forestry sector. Wine has historically been produced in Kosovo. The wine industry is successful and has been growing after the war. The main heartland of Kosovo's wine industry is in Rahovec, where millions of litres of wine are produced. The main cultivars include Pinot noir, Merlot, and Chardonnay. Kosovo exports wines to Germany and the United States. During the "glory days" of the wine industry, grapes were grown from the vineyard area of 9,000ha, divided into private and public ownership, and spread mainly throughout the south and west of Kosovo. The four state-owned wine production facilities were not as much "wineries" as they were "wine factories". Only the Rahovec facility that held approximately 36% of the total vineyard area had the capacity of around 50 million litres annually. The major share of the wine production was intended for exports. At its peak in 1989, the exports from the Rahovec facility amounted to 40 million litres and were mainly distributed to the German market.

Tourism 

The natural values of Kosovo represent quality tourism resources. The description of Kosovo's potential in tourism is closely related to its geographical location, in the center of the Balkan Peninsula in Southeastern Europe. It represents a crossroads which historically dates back to antiquity. Kosovo serves as a link in the connection between Central and Southern Europe and the Adriatic Sea and Black Sea. The mountainous west and southeast of Kosovo has great potential for winter tourism. Skiing takes place at the winter resort of Brezovica within the Šar Mountains.

Kosovo is generally rich in various topographical features, including high mountains, lakes, canyons, steep rock formations and rivers. Brezovica ski resort, with the close proximity to the Pristina Airport (60 km) and Skopje International Airport (70 km), is a possible destination for international tourists. Other major attractions include the capital, Pristina, the historical cities of Prizren, Peja and Gjakova but also Ferizaj and Gjilan.

The New York Times included Kosovo on the list of 41 places to visit in 2011.

Transport 

 Currently, there are two main motorways in Kosovo: the R7 connecting Kosovo with Albania and the R6 connecting Pristina with the Macedonian border at Elez Han. The construction of the new R7.1 Motorway began in 2017.
The R7 Motorway (part of Albania-Kosovo Highway) links Kosovo to Albania's Adriatic coast in Durrës. Once the remaining European route (E80) from Pristina to Merdare section project will be completed, the motorway will link Kosovo through the present European route (E80) highway with the Pan-European corridor X (E75) near Niš in Serbia. The R6 Motorway, forming part of the E65, is the second motorway constructed in the region. Construction of the motorway started in 2014 and finished in 2019.

Trainkos operates daily passenger trains on two routes: Pristina – Fushë Kosovë – Pejë, as well as Pristina – Fushë Kosovë – Ferizaj – Skopje, North Macedonia (the latter in cooperation with Macedonian Railways). In addition, Srbija Voz, subsidiary of Serbian Railways, operates a train service from Kraljevo, Serbia to North Mitrovica. Also, freight trains run throughout the country.

The nation hosts two airports, Pristina International Airport and Gjakova Airport. Pristina International Airport is located southwest of Pristina. It is Kosovo's only international airport and the only port of entry for air travelers to Kosovo. Gjakova Airport was built by the Kosovo Force (KFOR) following the Kosovo War, next to an existing airfield used for agricultural purposes, and was used mainly for military and humanitarian flights. The local and national government plans to offer Gjakova Airport for operation under a public-private partnership with the aim of turning it into a civilian and commercial airport.

Infrastructure

Health 

In the past, Kosovo's capabilities to develop a modern health care system were limited.
Low GDP during 1990 worsened the situation even more. However, the establishment of Faculty of Medicine in the University of Pristina marked a significant development in health care. This was also followed by launching different health clinics which enabled better conditions for professional development.

Nowadays the situation has changed, and the health care system in Kosovo is organised into three sectors: primary, secondary and tertiary health care.
Primary health care in Pristina is organised into thirteen family medicine centres and fifteen ambulatory care units. Secondary health care is decentralised in seven regional hospitals. Pristina does not have any regional hospital and instead uses University Clinical Center of Kosovo for health care services. University Clinical Center of Kosovo provides its health care services in twelve clinics, where 642 doctors are employed. At a lower level, home services are provided for several vulnerable groups which are not able to reach health care premises. Kosovo health care services are now focused on patient safety, quality control and assisted health.

Education 

Education for primary, secondary, and tertiary levels is predominantly public and supported by the state, run by the Ministry of Education. Education takes place in two main stages: primary and secondary education, and higher education.

The primary and secondary education is subdivided into four stages: preschool education, primary and low secondary education, high secondary education and special education. Preschool education is for children from the ages of one to five. Primary and secondary education is obligatory for everyone. It is provided by gymnasiums and vocational schools and also available in languages of recognised minorities in Kosovo, where classes are held in Albanian, Serbian, Bosnian, Turkish and Croatian. The first phase (primary education) includes grades one to five, and the second phase (low secondary education) grades six to nine. The third phase (high secondary education) consists of general education but also professional education, which is focused on different fields. It lasts four years. However, pupils are offered possibilities of applying for higher or university studies. According to the Ministry of Education, children who are not able to get a general education are able to get a special education (fifth phase).

Higher education can be received in universities and other higher-education institutes. These educational institutions offer studies for Bachelor, Master and PhD degrees. The students may choose full-time or part-time studies.

Media 

Kosovo ranked 58th in the 2008 Press Freedom Index report compiled by the Reporters Without Borders, while in 2016, it ranked 90th. The Media consists of different kinds of communicative media such as radio, television, newspapers, and internet web sites. Most of the media survive from advertising and subscriptions. As according to IREX there are 92 radio stations and 22 television stations.

Culture

Arts 

The architecture of Kosovo dates back to the Neolithic, Bronze and Middle Ages. It has been influenced by the presence of different civilisations and religions as evidenced by the structures which have survived to this day.

Kosovo is home to many monasteries and churches from the 13th and 14th centuries that represent the Serbian Orthodox legacy. Architectural heritage from the Ottoman Period includes mosques and hamams from the 15th, 16th and 17th centuries. Other historical architectural structures of interest include kullas from the 18th and 19th centuries, as well as a number of bridges, urban centers and fortresses. While some vernacular buildings are not considered important in their own right, taken together they are of considerable interest. During the 1999 conflict in Kosovo, many buildings that represent this heritage were destroyed or damaged. In the Dukagjini region, at least 500 kullas were attacked, and most of them destroyed or otherwise damaged.

In 2004, UNESCO recognised the Visoki Dečani monastery as World Heritage Site for its outstanding universal value. Two years later, the site of patrimony was extended as a serial nomination, to include three other religious monuments: Patriarchate of Peja, Our Lady of Ljeviš and Gračanica monastery under the name of Medieval Monuments in Kosovo. It consists of four Serbian Orthodox churches and monasteries, which represent the fusion of the eastern Orthodox Byzantine and the western Romanesque ecclesiastical architecture to form the Palaiologian Renaissance style. The construction was founded by members of Nemanjić dynasty, the most important dynasty of Serbia in the Middle Ages.

These monuments have come under attack, especially during the 2004 ethnic violence. In 2006, the property was inscribed on the List of World Heritage in Danger due to difficulties in its management and conservation stemming from the region's political instability.

Kosovar art was unknown to the international public for a very long time, because of the regime, many artists were unable to display their art in art galleries, and so were always on the lookout for alternatives, and even resorted to taking matters into their own hands. Until 1990, artists from Kosovo presented their art in many prestigious worldwide renowned centers. They were affirmed and evaluated highly because of their unique approach to the arts considering the circumstances in which they were created, making them distinguished and original.

In February 1979, the Kosova National Art Gallery was founded. It became the highest institution of visual arts in Kosovo. It was named after one of the most prominent artists of Kosovo Muslim Mulliqi. Engjëll Berisha, Masar Caka, Tahir Emra, Abdullah Gërguri, Hysni Krasniqi, Nimon Lokaj, Aziz Nimani, Ramadan Ramadani, Esat Valla and Lendita Zeqiraj are some of few Albanian painters born in Kosovo.

Cuisine 

The Kosovar cuisine is mixed with influences of the Albanian and Serbian origins of its majority population. Located at the crossroad of Albanian, Ottoman, Romance and Slavic cultures, Kosovo has enriched its own cuisine adopting and maintaining some of their cooking traditions and techniques.

Food is an important component in the social life of the people of Kosovo particularly during religious holidays such as Christmas, Easter and Ramadan. For festive occasions, Baklava, Lokum and Halva are traditionally prepared in almost every household throughout Kosovo and the Balkans regardless of ethnicity or cultural identity.

Perhaps the most prominent and traditional examples of Kosovar food include the Flia and Pite which are served with assorted vegetables, fruit preserves, honey and yogurt. Flia is composed of multiple layered crepe and is predominantly brushed with cream while Pite are filled with a mixture of salty cheese, meat, potatoes or leek.

The cuisine of Kosovo features a wide range of fresh fruits, vegetables and herbs such as salt, red and black pepper and vegeta. The people of Kosovo enjoy a wide variety of meat and fish products among other chicken, beef, kebab, Sujuk and lamb which is considered to be the traditional meat for religious occasions due to its religious connections.

Tea such as Albanian-style mountain tea or Russian and Turkish-style black tea are a widely consumed beverage throughout Kosovo and particularly served at cafés, restaurants or at home. Coffee is another popular drink although Kosovo is steeped in culture and their coffee culture is a big part of the modern society.

Sports 

Sport is a significant component of the society and culture of Kosovo. The most prominent sports in Kosovo include football, basketball, judo, boxing, volleyball and handball. The Olympic Committee of Kosovo became a full member of the International Olympic Committee in 2014. It participated at the 2015 European Games in Azerbaijan, 2019 European Games in Minsk and the 2016 Summer Olympics in Brazil.

By far the most popular sport in Kosovo is football. 1922 saw the founding of Kosovo's first clubs, including KF Vëllaznimi and FC Prishtina. During the Cold War era from 1945 until 1991, football in former Yugoslavia advanced so rapidly that in 1946, the Federation of Kosovo was formed as a subsidiary of the Federation of Yugoslavia. Prishtina were the nation's most successful club during that period, spending five years in the top-tier Yugoslav First League and reaching the semi-finals of the 1987-88 Yugoslav Cup. In 1991, an unsanctioned Kosovar league system known as the Liga e Pavarur e Kosovës ("Independent League of Kosovo") was set up, running parallel to the official Yugoslav leagues; in 1999, in the wake of the Kosovo War, this became Kosovo's official league system.

Three footballers from Kosovo – Milutin Šoškić, Fahrudin Jusufi, and Vladimir Durković – were part of the Yugoslavia squad that won a gold medal at the 1960 Summer Olympics and a silver medal at the 1960 European Championship. Kosovar-born goalkeeper Stevan Stojanović became the first goalkeeper to captain a European Cup-winning team when he captained Red Star Belgrade to victory in the 1991 European Cup Final.

The 2010s saw an increase in the number of Kosovar players of Albanian origin playing in top European teams. These include Lorik Cana, who captained Marseille and Sunderland as well as the Albanian national team; Valon Behrami who played for West Ham United, Udinese, and the Swiss national team; Xherdan Shaqiri, who won the 2018-19 UEFA Champions League with Liverpool and also plays for Switzerland internationally; and Adnan Januzaj, who began his career at Manchester United and currently represents Belgium.

Basketball is also a popular sport in Kosovo. The first championship was held in 1991, with the participation of eight teams. The Basketball Federation of Kosovo was accepted as a full member of FIBA on 13 March 2015. Notable players born in Kosovo who played for the successful Yugoslavia and Serbia national teams include Zufer Avdija, Marko Simonović and Dejan Musli, some of whom continue to compete for Serbia despite FIBA's recognition of Kosovo.

Judoka Majlinda Kelmendi became World Champion in 2013 and 2014, and also the European Champion in 2014. At the Summer Olympics 2016, Kelmendi became the first decorated Kosovar athlete to win a gold medal, also the first gold medal for Kosovo in a major sport tournament. Nora Gjakova won the first medal for Kosovo at the first European Games in 2015, when she earned bronze in 57 kg category. In the second European Games in 2019, Kelmendi won a gold medal, Gjakova a silver medal and Loriana Kuka a bronze medal.

Music 

Although the music in Kosovo is diverse, authentic Albanian and Serbian music still exist. Albanian music is characterised by the use of the Çifteli. Classical music is well known in Kosovo and has been taught at several music schools and universities. In 2014, Kosovo submitted their first film for the Academy Award for Best Foreign Language Film, with Three Windows and a Hanging directed by Isa Qosja.

In the past, epic poetry in Kosovo and Northern Albania was sung on a lahuta and then a more tuneful çiftelia was used which has two strings-one for the melody and one for drone. Kosovar music is influenced by Turkish music due to the almost 500-year span of Ottoman rule in Kosovo though Kosovar folklore has preserved its originality and exemplary. Archaeological research tells how old this tradition is and how it was developed in parallel with other traditional music in the Balkans. Roots dating to the 5th century BC have been found in paintings on stones of singers with instruments. (There is a famous portrait of "Pani" holding an instrument similar to a flute).

The contemporary music artists Rita Ora, Dua Lipa and Era Istrefi, are all of Albanian origin and have achieved international recognition for their music. One widely recognised musician from Prizren is guitarist Petrit Çeku, winner of several international prizes.

Serbian music from Kosovo presents a mixture of traditional music, which is part of the wider Balkan tradition, with its own distinctive sound, and various Western and Turkish influences. Serb songs from Kosovo were an inspiration for 12th song wreath by composer Stevan Mokranjac. Most of Serbian music from Kosovo was dominated by church music, with its own share of sung epic poetry. Serbian national instrument Gusle is also used in Kosovo.

Viktorija is the only artist from Kosovo who represented Yugoslavia in the Eurovision Song Contest as part of Aska in 1982. Singer Rona Nishliu finished 5th in the 2012 Eurovision Song Contest, while Lindita represented Albania in 2017. Several Serbian singers from Kosovo have also participated in the Serbian national selection for the Eurovision Song Contest. Nevena Božović represented Serbia in the Junior Eurovision Song Contest and twice in the Eurovision Song Contest, firstly as a member of Moje 3 in 2013 and as a solo act in 2019.

Cinema 

The film industry of Kosovo dates from the 1970s. In 1969, the parliament of Kosovo established Kosovafilm, a state institution for the production, distribution and showing of films. Its initial director was the actor Abdurrahman Shala, followed by writer and noted poet Azem Shkreli, under whose direction the most successful films were produced. Subsequent directors of Kosovafilm were Xhevar Qorraj, Ekrem Kryeziu and Gani Mehmetaj. After producing seventeen feature films, numerous short films and documentaries, the institution was taken over by the Serbian authorities in 1990 and dissolved. Kosovafilm was reestablished after Yugoslav withdrawal from the region in June 1999 and has since been endeavoring to revive the film industry in Kosovo.

The International Documentary and Short Film Festival is the largest film event in Kosovo. The Festival is organised in August in Prizren, which attracts numerous international and regional artists. In this annually organised festival, films are screened twice a day in three open-air cinemas as well as in two regular cinemas. Except for its films, the festival is also well known for lively nights after the screening. Various events happen within the scope of the festival: workshops, DokuPhoto exhibitions, festival camping, concerts, which altogether turn the city into a charming place to be. In 2010, Dokufest was voted as one of the 25 best international documentary festivals.

International actors of Albanian origin from Kosovo include Arta Dobroshi, James Biberi, Faruk Begolli and Bekim Fehmiu. The Prishtina International Film Festival is the largest film festival, held annually in Pristina, in Kosovo that screens prominent international cinema productions in the Balkan region and beyond, and draws attention to the Kosovar film industry.

The movie Shok was nominated for the Academy Award for Best Live Action Short Film at the 88th Academy Awards. The movie was written and directed by Oscar nominated director Jamie Donoughue, based on true events during the Kosovo war. Shok'''s distributor is Ouat Media, and the social media campaign is led by Team Albanians.

 Holidays 

 See also 
 List of Kosovo Albanians
 Outline of Kosovo
 Partition of Albania

References

 Sources 

 

 

 External links 
 United Nations Interim Administration in Kosovo
 European Union Rule of Law Mission in Kosovo
 Government of the Republic of Kosovo
 Serbian Ministry for Kosovo and Metohija
 
 Kosovo. The World Factbook''. Central Intelligence Agency.
 

 

Albanian-speaking countries and territories
Serbian-speaking countries and territories
Bosnian-speaking countries and territories
Turkish-speaking countries and territories
Disputed territories in Europe
Southeastern European countries
Southern European countries
Separatism in Serbia
States and territories established in 2008
States with limited recognition
2008 establishments in Kosovo
Countries in Europe
Landlocked countries
Balkan countries
Republics